In sociology, macrostructures, often simply called 'structure', correspond to the overall organization of society, described at a rather large-scale level, featuring for instance social groups, organizations, institutions, nation-states and their respective properties and relations. In this case, societal macrostructures are distinguished from societal microstructures consisting of the situated social interaction of social actors, often described in terms of agency. This distinction in sociology has given rise to the well-known macro-micro debate, in which microsociologists claim the primacy of interaction as the constituents of societal structures, and macrosociologists the primacy of given social structure as a general constraint on interaction.

One important macrostructure is patriarchy, the traditional system of economic and political inequality between women and men in most societies.

References 

 Alexander, J. C., Giesen, B., Münch, R., & Smelser, N. J. (Eds.). (1987). The micro-macro link. Berkeley, CA: University of California Press.
 Anthony Giddens (1986). The constitution of society: Outline of the theory of structuration. Berkeley: University of California Press.
 Jones, B., Gallagher, B. J., & McFalls, J. A. (1995). Sociology. Micro, macro, and mega structures. Ft. Worth, TX: Harcourt Brace.
 Knorr-Cetina, K., & Cicourel, A. V. (Eds.). (1981). Advances in social theory and methodology. Towards an integration of micro- and macrosociologies. London: Routledge & Kegan Paul.
 Tepperman, L., & Rosenberg, M. M. (1998). Macro/micro: A brief introduction to sociology. Scarborough, Ont.: Prentice-Hall Canada.
 Teun A. van Dijk (1980). Macrostructures: An interdisciplinary study of global structures in discourse, interaction, and cognition. Hillsdale, NJ: Erlbaum.

Sociological terminology